Royal Air Lao was the national air carrier of the Kingdom of Laos that operated from 1962 to 1974.

History 
The company was founded in 1962. In September 1976 the Civil Aviation Company was formed from the merger of Royal Air Lao and Lao Air Lines. Today the successor is Lao Airlines.

Destinations 

Hong Kong – Kai Tak Airport

 Cambodia
Phnom Penh – Pochentong Airport

Canton – Canton International Airport

Huay Xai – Huay Xay Airport
Luang Prabang – Luang Prabang International Airport
Pakxe – Pakxe Airport
Thakhek – Thakhek Airport
Sayaboury – Sayaboury Airport
Savannakhet – Savannakhet Airport
Vientiane – Vientiane Airport (Hub)

Kuala Lumpur – Subang Airport

Hanoi – Hanoi International Airport

Saigon – Tan Son Nhat Air Base

Bangkok – Bangkok International Airport
Chieng Mai – Chieng Mai International Airport

Fleet 
Aircraft that were in service were

 Douglas C-47 Skytrain
 Lockheed L-188 Electra
 Boeing 307 Stratoliner
 Sud Aviation Caravelle III (XW-PNH)
 Curtiss C-46 Commando
 Douglas DC-3
 Douglas C-54A-10-DC Skymaster
 Vickers Viscount
 Convair 440

Codeshare partners 
Royal Air Lao codeshared with the following airlines:

 Air France

See also 

 Air Vietnam
 Royal Air Cambodge

References

External links

Defunct airlines of Laos
Airlines established in 1962
Airlines disestablished in 1976
Companies of Laos
Government-owned airlines
Organizations with royal patronage